Henry Clay High School is an American public high school in Lexington, Kentucky. Opened on Main Street in 1928, it was named in honor of the Kentuckian and United States statesman, Henry Clay. The Main Street location now houses the main offices of the Fayette County Public Schools system. The school was ranked in 2022 by U.S. News & World Report as #18 of schools in Kentucky and #1,705 nationally. The school's facility on Fontaine Road opened in 1970.

History
In 1834, the first four-room public school was built in Lexington. It was sponsored by a man named William Morton. Seventy years later, the first four-year high school in Lexington opened on the corner of Walnut and Short streets. This school was named Morton High School.

In 1927, the board of education granted permission for a new school to be built on East Main Street. On July 6, 1928, the board adopted the name Henry Clay High School, requested by the Daughters of the American Revolution.

Demographics
The demographic breakdown by race/ethnicity of the 2,058 students enrolled for the 2021–2022 school year was:

Speech and debate team
The Henry Clay Speech and Debate team is currently lead by coach Ryan Ray. The Debate team has won the Kentucky State championship 13 times, in 1991, 1992, 2007, 2011, 2014, 2015, 2016, 2017, 2018, 2019, 2020, 2021, and 2022.

Athletics
HCHS offers many varsity sports including:
Archery was added as a varsity sport in the 2012/2013 school year

HCHS also offers hockey, ultimate Frisbee, boys' volleyball, and lacrosse only as club sports since they are not sanctioned sports with the Kentucky High School Athletic Association, and the Blue Devil Marching Band in its own competitive arena. The HCHS Marching Band placed as Grand Champions in the Mid-states Band Association circuit for years 2005-2007, and reserved Grand Champions in 2008. In 2006, the ultimate Frisbee team, Grapes of Wrath, fought their way to a city championship, led by captain and team MVP, Steven Myers. The ultimate Frisbee team is currently enjoying a stellar 2008-2009 season which has included the City Championship and State Championship, as well as a top 10 national ranking by the UPA. Also the lacrosse team made it to the Division 2 State Championship in 2007 with an undefeated, 9-0 record. They lost to the Eastern Eagles in double overtime. In the 2012-2013 season, the Henry Clay men's lacrosse team posted an undefeated 18-0 record, defeating Lexington Catholic High School by a score of 10-4 to capture the Division 2 State Championship. During the 2012-2013 season the Henry Clay men's lacrosse team was ranked in the top ten nationally in goal defense and goal differential, while ranking eleventh nationally in goals scored.

Notable alumni

References

External links
 

1928 establishments in Kentucky
educational institutions established in 1928
public high schools in Kentucky
schools in Lexington, Kentucky